The 2006–07 Anaheim Ducks season was the 14th season of operation (13th season of play) for the National Hockey League (NHL) franchise. It was the team's 1st season as the Anaheim Ducks. The Ducks clinched their first Pacific Division title in team history with 110 points, and defeated the Ottawa Senators in the Stanley Cup Final four games to one. It was the first Stanley Cup in franchise history, as well as the first time a team in the state of California won the Stanley Cup.

Off-season
Under new ownership, the Mighty Ducks of Anaheim changed their team and arena's name, logo and player uniforms. The change involving their name was dropping the "Mighty" from their name, and completely changing their jerseys to black, gold, orange and white colours rather than the eggplant, jade, silver and white from years past.

In a major acquisition, the club acquired defenseman Chris Pronger in a trade from the Edmonton Oilers. Pronger had recently appeared in the 2006 Stanley Cup Final and on the basis of the deal, the media felt that the Ducks would be one of the favorites for the Cup. In the 2006 NHL Entry Draft, the Ducks chose Mark Mitera with their first-round pick, 19th overall.

Not only did the Ducks change their name and logos, but their home arena of 13 years saw some changes as well. On October 3, 2006, the Arrowhead Pond of Anaheim was officially renamed Honda Center. The partnership was reportedly for 15 years with an option to extend the naming agreement 10 years. Other changes to the arena included new displays in the rafters behind the goals and four large "Honda Center" signs on each corner of the building. During the pre-season, however, the arena was officially still the Arrowhead Pond of Anaheim.

Regular season
The team came out of the gate to set an NHL record by earning at least one point in each of their first 16 games, a streak which ended exactly five weeks after their first game. They went 12–0–4 (28 points) before they lost their first regulation game of the year, a 3–0 shutout to the Calgary Flames, on November 10, 2006. The streak was broken seven years later by the 2012–13 Chicago Blackhawks, who went 24 games with a point. Behind goaltending by Jean-Sebastien Giguere and Ilya Bryzgalov, an offense headed by Teemu Selanne and a defense anchored by Scott Niedermayer and off-season acquisition Chris Pronger, the Ducks had worked their way to one of the NHL's best records.

On January 9, the NHL announced that Scott Niedermayer had been voted by the fans to start at defense in the 2007 All-Star Game in Dallas, Texas. He later declined to appear, deciding to rest a stress fracture in his foot. Ed Jovanovski of the Phoenix Coyotes was added to replace him. The Ducks' Andy McDonald was later added to replace Henrik Zetterberg of the Detroit Red Wings.

Playoffs
The Anaheim Ducks ended the 2006–07 regular season tied in points with the West-leading Nashville Predators, with 110 points. The Predators, however, had three more wins, but the Ducks nonetheless earned the second seed as they won the Pacific Division.

The Ducks defeated the Minnesota Wild in the first round, four games to one. In the second round, the Ducks defeated the Vancouver Canucks by the same four games to one result. In the Conference Final, the Ducks defeated the Detroit Red Wings four games to two to advance to the Stanley Cup Final for the second time in franchise history. In the Final, the Ducks defeated the Ottawa Senators four games to one to claim the franchise's first Stanley Cup championship.

Schedule and results

Pre-season 

|- align="center" bgcolor="#ffbbbb"
| 1 || September 18 || Kings || 4–5 ||  || Garon (1–0–0) || Leighton (0–1–0) ||  || 0–1–0 || Arrowhead Pond of Anaheim || L1
|- align="center" bgcolor="#bbffbb"
| 2 || September 20 || Sharks || 6–3 ||  ||  ||  ||  || 1–1–0 || Arrowhead Pond of Anaheim || W1
|- align="center" bgcolor="#bbffbb"
| 3 || September 16 || Canucks || 5–1 ||  || Giguere (1–0–0) || Luongo (0–2–0) ||  || 2–1–0 || Arrowhead Pond of Anaheim || W2
|- align="center" bgcolor="#ffbbbb"
| 4 || September 23 || @ Sharks || 3–4 ||  || Toskala (1–0–0) ||  ||  || 2–2–0 || Save Mart Center || L1
|- align="center" bgcolor="#ffdddd"
| 5 || September 24 || @ Canucks || 3–4 || SO || Luongo (1–2–0) || Bryzgalov (0–0–1) ||  || 2–2–1 || General Motors Place || O1
|- align="center" bgcolor="#ffdddd"
| 6 || September 25 || @ Kings || 4–5 || SO ||  || Giguere (1–0–1) ||  || 2–2–2 || Staples Center || O2
|- align="center" bgcolor="#bbffbb"
| 7 || September 27 || Coyotes || 3–2 ||  || Bryzgalov (1–0–1) || Joseph (0–1–0) ||  || 3–2–2 || Arrowhead Pond of Anaheim || W1
|- align="center" bgcolor="#ffdddd"
| 8 || September 30 || @ Coyotes || 1–2 || OT || Joseph (1–1–0) || Giguere (1–0–2) ||  || 3–2–3 || Glendale Arena || O1
|-

Regular season

|- align="center" bgcolor="#bbffbb" 
| 1 || October 6 || Kings || 4–3 || || Giguere (1–0–0) || Cloutier (0–1–0) || 17,174 || 1–0–0 || Honda Center || W1 || bgcolor="bbcaff" | 2 
|- align="center" bgcolor="#bbffbb" 
| 2 || October 7 || @ Coyotes || 2–1 || || Bryzgalov (1–0–0) || Joseph (1–1–0) || 15,897 || 2–0–0 || Glendale Arena || W2 || bgcolor="bbcaff" | 4 
|- align="center" bgcolor="#bbffbb" 
| 3 || October 9 || Blues || 2–0 || || Giguere (2–0–0) || Sanford (0–1–0) || 13,389 || 3–0–0 || Honda Center || W3 || bgcolor="bbcaff" | 6 
|- align="center" bgcolor="#ffdddd"
| 4 || October 11 || Islanders || 4–5 || SO || Dunham (1–1–0) || Giguere (2–0–1) || 12,394 || 3–0–1 || Honda Center || O1 || bgcolor="bbffbb" | 7 
|- align="center" bgcolor="#ffdddd"
| 5 || October 15 || Stars || 3–4 || SO || Turco (5–0–0) || Giguere (2–0–2) || 15,269 || 3–0–2 || Honda Center || O2 || bgcolor="bbcaff" | 8 
|- align="center" bgcolor="#bbffbb" 
| 6 || October 18 || Red Wings || 4–1 || || Giguere (3–0–2) || Hasek (2–2–1) || 14,767 || 4–0–2 || Honda Center || W1 || bgcolor="bbcaff" | 10 
|- align="center" bgcolor="#bbffbb" 
| 7 || October 20 || Wild || 2–1 || || Giguere (4–0–2) || Fernandez (5–1–0) || 13,430 || 5–0–2 || Honda Center || W2 || bgcolor="bbcaff" | 12 
|- align="center" bgcolor="#bbffbb" 
| 8 || October 22 || @ Kings || 3–2 || SO || Giguere (5–0–2) || Garon (2–1–1) || 18,118 || 6–0–2 || Staples Center || W3 || bgcolor="bbcaff" | 14 
|- align="center" bgcolor="#bbffbb" 
| 9 || October 25 || Oilers || 6–2 || || Giguere (6–0–2) || Roloson (5–3–0) || 13,537 || 7–0–2 || Honda Center || W4 || bgcolor="bbcaff" | 16 
|- align="center" bgcolor="#ffdddd" 
| 10 || October 27 || @ Wild || 2–3 || SO || Fernandez (8–1–0) || Giguere (6–0–3) || 18,568 || 7–0–3 || Xcel Energy Center || O1 || bgcolor="bbffbb" | 17 
|- align="center" bgcolor="#bbffbb" 
| 11 || October 28 || @ Blackhawks || 3–0 || || Bryzgalov (2–0–0) || Boucher (0–4–0) || 13,580 || 8–0–3 || United Center || W1 || bgcolor="bbffbb" | 19 
|- align="center" bgcolor="#bbffbb" 
| 12 || October 30 || @ Blues || 6–5 || SO || Giguere (7–0–3) ||  Sanford (1–1–2) || 8,629 || 9–0–3 || Scottrade Center || W2 || bgcolor="bbffbb" | 21 
|-

|- align="center" bgcolor="#ffdddd" 
| 13 || November 1 || Rangers || 3–4 || OT 3:09 || Weekes (1–1–0) || Giguere (7–0–4) || 13,350 || 9–0–4 || Honda Center || O1 || bgcolor="bbffbb" | 22 
|- align="center" bgcolor="#bbffbb" 
| 14 || November 3 || Coyotes || 6–2 || || Bryzgalov (3–0–0) || Joseph (2–6–0) || 14,833 || 10–0–4 || Honda Center || W1 || bgcolor="bbffbb" | 24 
|- align="center" bgcolor="#bbffbb" 
| 15 || November 6 || Penguins || 3–2 || OT :44 || Giguere (8–0–4) || Thibault (0–0–1) || 16,599 || 11–0–4 || Honda Center || W2 || bgcolor="bbffbb" | 26 
|- align="center" bgcolor="#bbffbb" 
| 16 || November 9 || @ Canucks || 6–0 ||  || Giguere (9–0–4) || Luongo (8–7–1) || 18,630 || 12–0–4 || General Motors Place || W3 || bgcolor="bbffbb" | 28 
|- align="center" bgcolor="#ffbbbb"
| 17 || November 10 || @ Flames || 0–3 || || Kiprusoff (6–7–1) || Bryzgalov (3–1–0) || 19,289 || 12–1–4 || Pengrowth Saddledome || L1 || bgcolor="bbffbb" | 28 
|- align="center" bgcolor="#bbffbb" 
| 18 || November 12 || Wild || 3–2 || || Giguere (10–0–4) || Backstrom (2–1–0) || 16,306 || 13–1–4 || Honda Center || W1 || bgcolor="bbffbb" | 30 
|- align="center" bgcolor="#ffbbbb" 
| 19 || November 15 || Flyers || 4–7 || || Esche (2–3–0) || Giguere (10–1–4) || 15,379 || 13–2–4 || Honda Center || L1 || bgcolor="bbffbb" | 30 
|- align="center" bgcolor="#ffdddd" 
| 20 || November 17 || Blackhawks || 3–4 || SO || Khabibulin (5–2–0) || Bryzgalov (3–1–1) || 16,526 || 13–2–5 || Honda Center || O1 || bgcolor="bbffbb" | 31 
|- align="center" bgcolor="#bbffbb" 
| 21 || November 19 || Coyotes || 6–4 || || Giguere (11–1–4) ||  Joseph (4–10–0) || 16,394 || 14–2–5 || Honda Center || W1 || bgcolor="bbffbb" | 33 
|- align="center" bgcolor="#bbffbb" 
| 22 || November 21 || Sharks || 5–0 || || Giguere (12–1–4) || Nabokov (5–5–0) || 15,013 || 15–2–5 || Honda Center || W2 || bgcolor="bbffbb" | 35 
|- align="center" bgcolor="#ffdddd" 
| 23 || November 22 || @ Avalanche || 2–3 || SO || Theodore (6–6–1) || Giguere (12–1–5) || 17,104 || 15–2–6 || Pepsi Center || O1 || bgcolor="bbffbb" | 36
|- align="center" bgcolor="#bbffbb" 
| 24 || November 24 || Devils || 4–2 || || Giguere (13–1–5) || Brodeur (12–8–0) || 16,599 || 16–2–6 || Honda Center || W1 || bgcolor="bbffbb" | 38
|- align="center" bgcolor="#bbffbb" 
| 25 || November 26 || Flames || 5–3 || || Wall (1–0–0) || McLennan (0–1–1) || 17,174 || 17–2–6 || Honda Center || W2 || bgcolor="bbffbb" | 40
|- align="center" bgcolor="#bbffbb" 
| 26 || November 28 || @ Oilers || 3–2 || OT 2:19 || Giguere (14–1–5) || Roloson (5–3–0) || 16,839 || 18–2–6 || Rexall Place || W3 || bgcolor="bbffbb" | 42
|- align="center" bgcolor="#bbffbb" 
| 27 || November 30 || @ Canucks || 2–1 || || Giguere (15–1–5) || Luongo (12–11–1) || 18,630 || 19–2–6 || General Motors Place || W4 || bgcolor="bbffbb" | 44
|-

|- align="center" bgcolor="#bbffbb" 
| 28 || December 2 || @ Kings || 4–3 || || Giguere (16–1–5) || Cloutier (4–9–2) || 16,141 || 20–2–6 || Staples Center || W5 || bgcolor="bbffbb" | 46
|- align="center" bgcolor="#ffbbbb" 
| 29 || December 3 || Kings || 2–3 || || Cloutier (5–9–2) || Giguere (16–2–5) || 17,174 || 20–3–6 || Honda Center || L1 || bgcolor="bbffbb" | 46
|- align="center" bgcolor="#bbffbb" 
| 30 || December 6 || Predators || 4–0 || || Giguere (17–2–5) || Mason (6–3–2) || 15,362 || 21–3–6 || Honda Center || W1 || bgcolor="bbffbb" |48
|- align="center" bgcolor="#bbffbb" 
| 31 || December 8 || @ Capitals || 6–1 || || Giguere (18–2–5) || Kolzig (10–7–3) || 12,269 || 22–3–6 || Verizon Center || W2 || bgcolor="bbffbb" | 50
|- align="center" bgcolor="#bbffbb" 
| 32 || December 9 || @ Lightning || 4–3 || || Giguere (19–2–5) || Denis (6–9–2) || 18,719 || 23–3–6 || St. Pete Times Forum || W3 || bgcolor="bbffbb" | 52
|- align="center" bgcolor="#bbffbb" 
| 33 || December 12 || @ Panthers || 5–4 || || Giguere (20–2–5) || Auld (6–10–4) || 13,140 || 24–3–6 || BankAtlantic Center || W4 || bgcolor="bbffbb" | 54
|- align="center" bgcolor="#bbffbb" 
| 34 || December 13 || @ Thrashers || 2–1 || || Giguere (21–2–5) || Lehtonen (13–7–4) || 16,028 || 25–3–6 || Philips Arena || W5 || bgcolor="bbffbb" | 56
|- align="center" bgcolor="#ffbbbb" 
| 35 || December 16 || @ Sharks || 3–4 || || Nabokov (10–6–0) || Giguere (21–3–5) || 17,496 || 25–4–6 || HP Pavilion at San Jose || L1 || bgcolor="bbffbb" | 56
|- align="center" bgcolor="#bbffbb" 
| 36 || December 18 || Flames || 4–1 || || Giguere (22–3–5) || Kiprusoff (16–11–2) || 17,174 || 26–4–6 || Honda Center || W1 || bgcolor="bbffbb" | 58
|- align="center" bgcolor="#bbffbb" 
| 37 || December 20 || Stars || 4–1 || || Giguere (23–3–5) || Turco (16–10–0) || 17,174 || 27–4–6 || Honda Center || W2 || bgcolor="bbffbb" | 60
|- align="center" bgcolor="#ffbbbb" 
| 38 || December 23 || @ Coyotes || 0–2 || || Tellqvist (4–3–1) || Giguere (23–4–5) || 14,843 || 27–5–6 || Jobing.com Arena || L1 || bgcolor="bbffbb" | 60
|- align="center" bgcolor="#bbffbb" 
| 39 || December 26 || @ Sharks || 4–3 || || Wall (2–0–0) || Nabokov (11–7–0) || 17,496 || 28–5–6 || HP Pavilion at San Jose || W1 || bgcolor="bbffbb" | 62
|- align="center" bgcolor="#ffbbbb" 
| 40 || December 29 || @ Hurricanes || 2–4 || || Ward (18–9–3) || Wall (2–1–0) || 18,790 || 28–6–6 || RBC Center || L1 || bgcolor="bbffbb" | 62
|- align="center" bgcolor="#ffbbbb" 
| 41 || December 31 || @ Wild || 3–4 || || Fernandez (16–13–0) || Wall (2–2–0) || 18,568 || 28–7–6 || Xcel Energy Center || L2 || bgcolor="bbffbb" | 62
|-

|- align="center" bgcolor="#ffbbbb" 
| 42 || January 2 || @ Red Wings || 1–2 || || Hasek (21–5–3) || Bryzgalov (3–2–1) || 20,066 || 28–8–6 || Joe Louis Arena || L3 || bgcolor="bbffbb" | 62
|- align="center" bgcolor="#ffbbbb" 
| 43 || January 5 || Blue Jackets || 3–4 || || Norrena (10–9–1) || Bryzgalov (3–3–1) || 17,405 || 28–9–6 || Honda Center || L4 || bgcolor="bbffbb" | 62
|- align="center" bgcolor="#bbffbb" 
| 44 || January 7 || Red Wings || 4–2 || || Bryzgalov (4–3–1) || Hasek (21–7–3) || 17,418 || 29–9–6 || Honda Center || W1 || bgcolor="bbffbb" | 64
|- align="center" bgcolor="#ffdddd" 
| 45 || January 9 || @ Predators || 4–5 || OT 3:12 || Vokoun (12–4–1) || Bryzgalov (4–3–2) || 11,821 || 29–9–7 || Gaylord Entertainment Center || O1 || bgcolor="bbffbb" | 65
|- align="center" bgcolor="#bbffbb" 
| 46 || January 11 || @ Stars || 5–1 || || Bryzgalov (5–3–2) || Turco (21–15–1) || 18,532 || 30–9–7 || American Airlines Center || W1 || bgcolor="bbffbb" | 67
|- align="center" bgcolor="#ffdddd" 
| 47 || January 13 || Avalanche || 2–3 || SO || Budaj (13–9–2) || Bryzgalov (5–3–3) || 17,174 || 30–9–8 || Honda Center || O1 || bgcolor="bbffbb" | 68
|- align="center" bgcolor="#ffbbbb" 
| 48 || January 16 || Blues || 2–6 || || Sanford (3–5–2) || Bryzgalov (5–4–3) || 17,174 || 30–10–8 || Honda Center || L1 || bgcolor="bbffbb" | 68
|- align="center" bgcolor="#ffbbbb" 
| 49 || January 18 || @ Oilers || 1–4 || || Roloson (20–17–4) || Bryzgalov (5–5–3) || 16,839 || 30–11–8 || Rexall Place || L2 || bgcolor="bbffbb" | 68
|- align="center" bgcolor="#ffbbbb" 
| 50 || January 19 || @ Flames || 2–3 || || Kiprusoff (23–16–3) || Bryzgalov (5–6–3) || 19,289 || 30–12–8 || Pengrowth Saddledome || L3 || bgcolor="bbffbb" | 68
|- align="center" bgcolor="#bbcaff" 
| colspan="3" | Jan. 24: All-Star Game (West wins—box) || 12–9 ||  || Turco (DAL) || Huet (MON) || 18,680 || 18,532 || American Airlines Center || colspan="2" | Dallas, TX
|- align="center" bgcolor="#bbffbb"
| 51 || January 28 || Stars  || 4–1 ||  || Giguere (24–4–5) || Turco (24–16–2) || 17,331 || 31–12–8 || Honda Center || W1 || bgcolor="bbffbb" | 70
|- align="center" bgcolor="#bbffbb"
| 52 || January 31 || Coyotes  || 2–1 ||  || Giguere (25–4–5) || Joseph (12–17–0) || 17,174 || 32–12–8 || Honda Center || W2 || bgcolor="bbffbb" | 72
|- align="center"

|- align="center" bgcolor="#ffbbbb"
| 53 || February 3 || @ Predators  || 0–3 ||  || Vokoun (16–6–1) || Giguere (25–5–5) || 17,113 || 32–13–8 || Gaylord Entertainment Center || L1 || bgcolor="bbffbb" | 72
|- align="center" bgcolor="#bbffbb"
| 54 || February 6 || @ Sharks  || 7–4 ||  || Giguere (26–5–5) || Toskala (22–8–1) || 17,496 || 33–13–8 || HP Pavilion at San Jose || W1 || bgcolor="bbffbb" | 74
|- align="center" bgcolor="#ffbbbb"
| 55 || February 7 || Sharks  || 2–3 ||  || Toskala (23–8–1) || Bryzgalov (5–7–3) || 17,466 || 33–14–8 || Honda Center || L1 || bgcolor="bbffbb" | 74
|- align="center" bgcolor="#ffbbbb"
| 56 || February 10 || @ Stars  || 0–1 ||  || Smith (7–3–0) || Giguere (26–6–5) || 17,793 || 33–15–8 || American Airlines Center || L2 || bgcolor="bbffbb" | 74
|- align="center" bgcolor="#ffbbbb"
| 57 || February 13 || @ Avalanche  || 0–2 ||  || Budaj (17–13–3) || Giguere (26–7–5) || 17,512 || 33–16–8 || Pepsi Center || L3 || bgcolor="bbffbb" | 74
|- align="center" bgcolor="#bbffbb"
| 58 || February 15 || @ Coyotes  || 5–4 || OT 1:53 || Giguere (27–7–5) || Joseph (14–20–1) || 15,038 || 34–16–8 || Jobing.com Arena || W1 || bgcolor="bbffbb" | 76
|- align="center" bgcolor="#bbffbb"
| 59 || February 17 || @ Kings  || 3–2 || SO || Giguere (28–7–5) || Garon (8–7–5) || 18,118 || 35–16–8 || Staples Center || W2 || bgcolor="bbffbb" | 78
|- align="center" bgcolor="#ffdddd"
| 60 || February 18 || Kings  || 3–4 || SO || Burke (4–3–2) || Giguere (28–7–6) || 17,363 || 35–16–9 || Honda Center || O1 || bgcolor="bbffbb" | 79
|- align="center" bgcolor="#ffdddd"
| 61 || February 20 || Canucks  || 2–3 || OT 2:19 || Sabourin (1–3–1) || Giguere (28–7–7) || 17,467 || 35–16–10 || Honda Center || O2 || bgcolor="bbffbb" | 80
|- align="center" bgcolor="#ffbbbb"
| 62 || February 23 || @ Stars  || 1–4 ||  || Smith (9–4–0) || Giguere (28–8–7) || 17,634 || 35–17–10 || American Airlines Center || L1 || bgcolor="bbffbb" | 80
|- align="center" bgcolor="#bbffbb"
| 63 || February 25 || Avalanche || 5–3 ||  || Giguere (29–8–7) || Theodore (11–14–1) || 17,174 || 36–17–10 || Honda Center || W1 || bgcolor="bbffbb" | 82
|- align="center" bgcolor="#bbffbb"
| 64 || February 26 || @ Sharks  || 3–2 || || Bryzgalov (6–7–3) || Nabokov (14–14–0) || 17,496 || 37–17–10 || HP Pavilion at San Jose || W2 || bgcolor="bbffbb" | 84
|-

|- align="center" bgcolor="#ffdddd"
| 65 || March 1 || @ Kings  || 3–4 || OT 3:17 || Burke (6–3–2) || Bryzgalov (6–7–4) || 17,620 || 37–17–11 || Staples Center || O1 || bgcolor="bbffbb" | 85
|- align="center" bgcolor="#bbffbb"
| 66 || March 2 || Sharks || 3–1 ||  || Giguere (30–8–7) || Nabokov (14–15–1) || 17,174 || 38–17–11 || Honda Center || W1 || bgcolor="bbffbb" | 87
|- align="center" bgcolor="#bbffbb"
| 67 || March 4 || Predators  || 3–2 || SO || Giguere (31–8–7) || Vokoun (21–8–3) || 17,174 || 39–17–11 || Honda Center || W2 || bgcolor="bbffbb" | 89
|- align="center" bgcolor="#bbffbb"
| 68 || March 7 || Coyotes || 2–1 ||  || Giguere (32–8–7) || Tellqvist (10–10–2) || 17,174 || 40–17–11 || Honda Center || W3 || bgcolor="bbffbb" | 91
|- align="center" bgcolor="#bbffbb"
| 69 || March 9 || Oilers || 5–1 ||  || Bryzgalov (7–7–4) || Roloson (25–28–5) || 17,174 || 41–17–11 || Honda Center || W4 || bgcolor="bbffbb" | 93
|- align="center" bgcolor="#bbffbb"
| 70 || March 11 || Canucks || 4–2 || || Giguere (33–8–7) || Luongo (39–20–4) ||| 17,174 || 42–17–11 || Honda Center || W5 || bgcolor="bbffbb" | 95
|- align="center" bgcolor="#ffdddd"
| 71 || March 14 || Blue Jackets || 5–4 || SO || Giguere (34–8–7) || Norrena (19–17–3) || 17,174 || 42–17–12 || Honda Center || O1 || bgcolor="bbffbb" | 96
|- align="center" bgcolor="#bbffbb"
| 72 || March 16 || Blackhawks || 5–2 || || Bryzgalov (8–7–4) || Khabibulin (23–21–5) || 17,174 || 43–17–12 || Honda Center || W1 || bgcolor="bbffbb" | 98
|- align="center" bgcolor="#ffbbbb"
| 73 || March 18 || Kings  || 3–5 || || Garon (11–8–6) || Giguere (34–8–8) || 17,174 || 43–18–12 || Honda Center || L1 || bgcolor="bbffbb" | 98
|- align="center" bgcolor="#ffbbbb"
| 74 || March 22 || @ Coyotes  || 2–1 ||  || Joseph (16–27–1) || Bryzgalov (8–8–4) || 15,593 || 43–19–12 || Jobing.com Arena || L2 || bgcolor="bbffbb" | 98
|- align="center" style="background: #000078; color: white"
| 75 || March 23 || Stars || 3–2 || OT 2:28 || Giguere (35–8–8) || Turco (32–19–5) || 17,174 || 44–19–12 || Honda Center || W1 || bgcolor="bbffbb" | 100
|- align="center" bgcolor="#ffbbbb"
| 76 || March 26 || @ Red Wings  || 0–1 || || Hasek (36–11–7) || Giguere (35–9–8) || 20,066 || 44–20–12 || Joe Louis Arena || L1 || bgcolor="bbffbb" | 100
|- align="center" bgcolor="#bbffbb"
| 77 || March 28 || @ Blackhawks || 3–1 || || Bryzgalov (9–8–4) || Khabibulin (23–25–5) || 11,295 || 45–20–12 || United Center || W1 || bgcolor="bbffbb" | 102
|- align="center" bgcolor="#bbffbb"
| 78 || March 29 || @ Blue Jackets || 5–2 || || Giguere (36–9–8) || Norrena (23–20–3) || 15,340 || 46–20–12 || Nationwide Arena || W2 || bgcolor="bbffbb" | 104
|- align="center" bgcolor="#bbffbb"
| 79 || March 31 || @ Blues || 3–2 || OT :25 || Giguere (37–9–8) || Bacashihua (2–5–3) || 18,609 || 47–20–12 || Scottrade Center || W3 || bgcolor="bbffbb" | 106
|-

|- align="center" bgcolor="#ffdddd"
| 80 || April 4 || Sharks || 2–3 || SO || Nabokov (24–15–3) || Bryzgalov (9–8–5) || 17,174 || 47–20–13 || Honda Center || O1 || bgcolor="bbffbb" | 107
|- align="center" bgcolor="#ffdddd"
| 81 || April 6 || @ Stars || 1–2 || SO || Turco (36–20–5) || Bryzgalov (9–8–6) || 18,584 || 47–20–14 || American Airlines Center || O2 || bgcolor="bbffbb" | 108
|- align="center" style="background: #007800; color: white"
| 82 || April 7 || @ Blue Jackets || 4–3 || || Bryzgalov (10–8–6) || Norrena (24–23–3) || 17,391 || 48–20–14 || Nationwide Arena || W1 || 110 
|-

Playoffs

|- align="center" bgcolor="#bbffbb"
| 1 || April 11 || Wild || 2–1 || || Bryzgalov (1–0) || Backstrom (0–1) || 17,180 || 1–0 || Honda Center || W1
|- align="center" bgcolor="#bbffbb"
| 2 || April 13 || Wild || 3–2 || || Bryzgalov (2–0) || Backstrom (0–2) || 17,324 || 2–0 || Honda Center || W2 
|- align="center" bgcolor="#bbffbb"
| 3 || April 15 || @ Wild || 2–1 || || Bryzgalov (3–0) || Backstrom (0–3) || 19,224 || 3–0 || Xcel Energy Center || W3 
|- align="center" bgcolor="#ffbbbb"
| 4 || April 17 || @ Wild || 1–4 || || Backstrom (1–3) || Bryzgalov (3–1) || 19,174 || 3–1 || Xcel Energy Center || L1 
|- align="center" bgcolor="#bbffbb"
| 5 || April 19 || Wild || 4–1 || || Giguere (1–0) || Backstrom (1–4) || 17,318 || 4–1 || Honda Center || W1 
|-

|- align="center" bgcolor="#bbffbb"
| 1 || April 25 || Canucks || 5–1 || || Giguere (2–0) || Luongo (4–4) || 17,250 || 1–0 || Honda Center || W1
|- align="center" bgcolor="#ffbbbb"
| 2 || April 27 || Canucks || 1–2 || 2OT 27:49 || Luongo (5–4) || Giguere (2–1) || 17,392 || 1–1 || Honda Center || L1
|- align="center" bgcolor="#bbffbb"
| 3 || April 29 || @ Canucks || 3–2 || || Giguere (3–1) || Luongo (5–5) || 18,630 || 2–1 || General Motors Place || W1
|- align="center" bgcolor="#bbffbb"
| 4 || May 1 || @ Canucks || 3–2 || 1OT 2:07 || Giguere (4–1) || Luongo (5–6) || 18,630 || 3–1 || General Motors Place || W2
|- align="center" bgcolor="#bbffbb"
| 5 || May 3 || Canucks || 2–1 || 2OT 24:30 || Giguere (5–1) || Luongo (5–7) || 17,407 || 4–1 || Honda Center || W3
|-

|- align="center" bgcolor="#ffbbbb"
| 1 || May 11 || @ Red Wings || 1–2 || || Hasek (9–4) || Giguere (5–2) || 19,939 || 0–1 || Joe Louis Arena || L1
|- align="center" bgcolor="#bbffbb"
| 2 || May 13 || @ Red Wings || 4–3 || 1OT 14:17 || Giguere (6–2) || Hasek (9–5) || 19,620 || 1–1 || Joe Louis Arena || W1
|- align="center" bgcolor="#ffbbbb"
| 3 || May 15 || Red Wings || 0–5 || || Hasek (10–5) || Giguere (6–3) || 17,358 || 1–2 || Honda Center || L1
|- align="center" bgcolor="#bbffbb"
| 4 || May 17 || Red Wings || 5–3 || || Giguere (7–3) || Hasek (10–6) || 17,375 || 2–2 || Honda Center || W1
|- align="center" bgcolor="#bbffbb"
| 5 || May 20 || @ Red Wings || 2–1 || 1OT 11:57 || Giguere (8–3) || Hasek (10–7) || 20,003 || 3–2 || Joe Louis Arena || W2
|- align="center" bgcolor="#bbffbb"
| 6 || May 22 || Red Wings || 4–3 ||  || Giguere (9–3) || Hasek (10–8) || 17,380 || 4–2 || Honda Center || W3
|-

|- align="center" bgcolor="#bbffbb"
| 1 || May 28 || Senators || 3–2 || || Giguere (10–3) || Emery (12–4) || 17,274 || 1–0 || Honda Center || W1
|- align="center" bgcolor="#bbffbb"
| 2 || May 30 || Senators || 1–0 || || Giguere (11–3) || Emery (12–5) || 17,258 || 2–0 || Honda Center || W2
|- align="center" bgcolor="#ffbbbb"
| 3 || June 2 || @ Senators || 3–5 || || Emery (13–5) || Giguere (11–4) || 20,500 || 2–1 || Scotiabank Place || L1
|- align="center" bgcolor="#bbffbb"
| 4 || June 4 || @ Senators || 3–2 || || Giguere (12–4) || Emery (13–6) || 20,500 || 3–1 || Scotiabank Place || W1
|- align="center" bgcolor="#bbffbb"
| 5 || June 6 || Senators || 6–2 || || Giguere (13–4) || Emery (13–7) || 17,372 || 4–1 || Honda Center || W2
|-

Standings

Divisional Standings

Player statistics

Awards and records

Conn Smythe Trophy – Scott Niedermayer

Records
On November 9, 2006, the Anaheim Ducks set an NHL open era record by remaining undefeated in regulation for the first 16 games of the season, with 12 wins and four overtime losses. The previous mark was set by the 1984–85 Edmonton Oilers, who had 12 wins and three ties.

Milestones
 Teemu Selanne scored his 500th goal on November 23, becoming only the second Finnish player to reach the mark.

2007 National Hockey League All-Star Game

The 2007 National Hockey League All-Star Game took place on January 24, 2007, at American Airlines Center in Dallas, Texas, home of the Dallas Stars. The Western Conference defeated the Eastern Conference 12-9. The following are Anaheim Ducks representatives who participated in the all-star game.

Forwards

Defensemen

Coaches

Transactions
The Ducks were involved in the following transactions during the 2006–07 season:

Trades

Free agents acquired

Free agents lost

Claimed off waivers

Lost on waivers

Player signings

Draft picks

Anaheim's picks at the 2006 NHL Entry Draft in Vancouver, British Columbia.

Farm teams

Portland Pirates
The Portland Pirates were Anaheim's affiliate in the AHL for the 2006–07 season.

Augusta Lynx
The Augusta Lynx were Anaheim's ECHL affiliate for the 2006–07 season.

Broadcasters
Local TV

Local Cable TV

Local Radio

See also 
 Anaheim Ducks
 Honda Center
2006–07 NHL season
2007 Stanley Cup Final

References

Game log: Anaheim Ducks game log on ESPN.com
Team standings: NHL standings on ESPN.com
Player stats: Anaheim Ducks player stats on NHL.com

Anaheim
Anaheim
Stanley Cup championship seasons
Western Conference (NHL) championship seasons
Anaheim Ducks seasons
ANA
Mighty Ducks of Anaheim
Mighty Ducks of Anaheim